

Belgium
Belgian Congo – Pierre Ryckmans, Governor-General of the Belgian Congo (1934–1946)

France
 French Somaliland – Armand Léon Annet, Governor of French Somaliland (1935–1937)
 Guinea – 
 Joseph Vadier, Lieutenant-Governor of Guinea (1935–1936)
 Louis Placide Blacher, Governor of Guinea (1936–1937)

Japan
 Karafuto – Takeshi Imamura, Governor-General of Karafuto (5 July 1932 – 7 May 1938)
 Korea – 
Kazushige Ugaki, Governor-General of Korea (1931–1936)
Jirō Minami, Governor-General of Korea (1936–1942)
 Taiwan – 
Kenzō Nakagawa, Governor-General of Taiwan (27 May 1932 – September 1936)
Seizō Kobayashi, Governor-General of Taiwan (June 1936 – November 1940)

Portugal
 Angola – António Lopes Matheus, High Commissioner of Angola (1935–1939)

United Kingdom
 Malta Colony
David Campbell, Governor of Malta (1931–1936)
Charles Bonham-Carter, Governor of Malta (1936–1940)
 Northern Rhodesia – Sir Hubert Winthrop Young, Governor of Northern Rhodesia (1935–1938)

Colonial governors
Colonial governors
1936